Loch is the Scottish Gaelic, Scots and Irish word for a lake or sea inlet. It is cognate with the Manx lough, Cornish logh, and one of the Welsh words for lake, llwch.

In English English and Hiberno-English, the anglicised spelling lough is commonly found in place names; in Lowland Scots and Scottish English, the spelling "loch" is always used. Many loughs are connected to stories of lake-bursts, signifying their mythical origin.

Sea-inlet lochs are often called sea lochs or sea loughs. Some such bodies of water could also be called firths, fjords, estuaries, straits or bays.

Background

This name for a body of water is Insular Celtic in origin and is applied to most lakes in
Scotland and to many sea inlets in the west and north of Scotland. The word comes from Proto-Indo-European *lókus ("lake, pool") and is related to Latin lacus ("lake, pond") and English lay ("lake").

Lowland Scots orthography, like Scottish Gaelic, Welsh and Irish, represents  with ch, so the word was borrowed with identical spelling.

English borrowed the word separately from a number of loughs in the previous Cumbric language areas of Northumbria and Cumbria. Earlier forms of English included the sound  as gh (compare Scots bricht with English bright). However, by the time Scotland and England joined under a single parliament, English had lost the  sound. This form was therefore used when the English settled Ireland. The Scots convention of using ch remained, hence the modern Scottish English loch.

In Welsh, what corresponds to lo is lu in Old Welsh and llw in Middle Welsh such as in today's Welsh placenames Llanllwchaiarn, Llwchwr, Llyn Cwm Llwch, Amlwch, Maesllwch, the Goidelic lo being taken into Scottish Gaelic by the gradual replacement of much Brittonic orthography with Goidelic orthography in Scotland.

Many of the loughs in Northern England have also previously been called "meres" (a Northern English dialect word for "lake" and an archaic Standard English word meaning "a lake that is broad in relation to its depth") such as the Black Lough in Northumberland. However, reference to the latter as loughs (lower case initial), rather than as lakes, inlets and so on, is unusual.

Some lochs in Southern Scotland have a Brythonic rather than Goidelic etymology, such as Loch Ryan where the Gaelic loch has replaced a Cumbric equivalent of Welsh llwch. The same is perhaps the case for water bodies in Northern England named with 'Low' or 'Lough' or otherwise it represents a borrowing of the Brythonic word into the Northumbrian dialect of Old English.

Although there is no strict size definition, a small loch is often known as a lochan (so spelled also in Scottish Gaelic; in Irish it is spelled lochán).

Perhaps the most famous Scottish loch is Loch Ness, although there are other large examples such as Loch Awe, Loch Lomond and Loch Tay.

Examples of sea lochs in Scotland include Loch Long, Loch Fyne, Loch Linnhe, and Loch Eriboll. Elsewhere in Britain, places like the Afon Dyfi can be considered sea lochs.

Uses of lochs
Some new reservoirs for hydroelectric schemes have been given names faithful to the names for natural bodies of water—for example, the Loch Sloy scheme, and Lochs Laggan and Treig (which form part of the Lochaber hydroelectric scheme near Fort William). Other expanses are simply called reservoirs, e.g. Blackwater Reservoir above Kinlochleven.

Scottish lakes
Scotland has very few bodies of water called lakes. The Lake of Menteith, an Anglicisation of the Scots Laich o Menteith meaning a "low-lying bit of land in Menteith", is applied to the loch there because of the similarity of the sounds of the words laich and lake. Until the 19th century the body of water was known as the Loch of Menteith.  The Lake of the Hirsel, Pressmennan Lake and Lake Louise are man-made bodies of water in Scotland known as lakes.

The word "loch" is sometimes used as a shibboleth to identify natives of England, because the fricative  sound is used in Scotland whereas most English people mispronounce the word as "lock".

Lochs outside Scotland and Ireland
As "loch" is a common Gaelic word, it is found as the root of several Manx place names.

The United States naval port of Pearl Harbor, on the south coast of the main Hawaiian island of Oahu, is one of a complex of sea inlets. Several are named as lochs, including South East Loch, Merry Loch, East Loch, Middle Loch and West Loch.

Loch Raven Reservoir is a reservoir in Baltimore County, Maryland.

Brenton Loch in the Falkland Islands is a sea loch, near Lafonia, East Falkland.

In the Scottish settlement of Glengarry County in present-day Eastern Ontario, there is a lake called Loch Garry. Loch Garry was named by those who settled in the area, Clan MacDonell of Glengarry, after the well-known loch their clan is from, Loch Garry in Scotland. Similarly, lakes named Loch Broom, Big Loch, Greendale Loch, and Loch Lomond can be found in Nova Scotia, along with Loch Leven in Newfoundland, and Loch Leven in Saskatchewan.

Loch Fyne is a fjord in Greenland named by Douglas Clavering in 1823.

See also

 List of lochs of Scotland
 List of loughs of Ireland
 List of loughs of England
 Ria
 Lake-burst

References

Highlands and Islands of Scotland
Scottish coast and countryside
Hydronymy
 
 
Shibboleths
Lakes of Northern Ireland